Yengi Qaleh (also Romanized as Yengī Qal‘eh; also known as Yengeh Qal‘eh) is a village in Razan Rural District, in the Central District of Razan County, Hamadan Province, Iran. At the 2006 census, its population was 468, in 111 families.

References 

Populated places in Razan County